Brachinus fumans, the American bombardier beetle, is a species of ground beetle in the family Carabidae. It is found in North America.

References

Further reading

 
 
 
 
 

Brachininae
Articles created by Qbugbot
Beetles described in 1781